Martin Nešpor (born 5 June 1990) is a Czech professional footballer who played as a forward for Silon Táborsko.

Club career

Sparta Prague
On 16 June 2016. Nešpor signed to Czech First League side Sparta Prague.

Loan at Piast Gliwice
On 9 July 2017. Nešpor joined Ekstraklasa side Piast Gliwice, on a season-long loan.

Zagłębie Lubin
On 23 August 2016. Nešpor signed to Ekstraklasa side Zagłębie Lubin.

Loan at Skënderbeu
On 1 September 2017. Nešpor signed to Kategoria Superiore side Skënderbeu. On 6 September 2017, he made his debut with Skënderbeu in an Albanian Cup match against Adriatiku after being named in the starting line-up.

References

External links

Czech footballers
Czech Republic youth international footballers
Czech Republic under-21 international footballers
1990 births
Living people
Czech First League players
Bohemians 1905 players
FK Mladá Boleslav players
Ekstraklasa players
Piast Gliwice players
Zagłębie Lubin players
AC Sparta Prague players
Expatriate footballers in Poland
Czech expatriate sportspeople in Poland
Footballers from Prague
SK Sigma Olomouc players
Expatriate footballers in Albania
Association football forwards
KF Skënderbeu Korçë players
FK Jablonec players
FC Silon Táborsko players
Czech National Football League players